Ajay Nagrath (born 16 February 1986) is an Indian television and movie actor and is the son of Bollywood actor Anil Nagrath. Recently, he played the role of Pankaj in C.I.D. He has done many roles in many TV shows and even films, but there came a point in his life when he was unhappy that his weight had become his identity in the industry. He said "I used to be a couch potato."

Filmography

Television

References

External links 
 

Living people
Indian male film actors
21st-century Indian male actors
Indian male television actors
Male actors in Hindi television
Participants in Indian reality television series
1986 births